Adenia cissampeloides is a species of flowering plant in the passionflower family, Passifloraceae. It is native to tropical Africa.

Description
The stems are pale green to gray green and can be spotted. The leaves have smooth edges and are punctate (marked with dots), with a cordate (heart-shaped) to truncate (square) base. A. cissampeloides is monecious: it has unisexual flowers that occur in inflorescences. Male flowers have free or connate (fused together) filaments. Fruits are capsules with one to three fruits occurring per inflorescence.

Taxonomy
It was first described in 1849 as Modecca cissampeloides. In 1897, it was moved to the genus Adenia.

Distribution and habitat
Adenia cissampeloides is currently found naturally in rainforests, swamps, and savannas in Africa.

Uses
It has several different human uses from medicine to consumption. Along with several other plants, it is used in Ghana in traditional medicines as a treatment for malaria. The leaves can be cooked and eaten as a vegetable.

References

cissampeloides
Flora of Guinea-Bissau